Flood is the 1994 debut full-length album by the English rock band Headswim. Its original title was going to be  Precipity Flood. The album included three singles, "Gone to Pot", "Soup", and "Crawl".

Critical reception

David Sinclair of Q said, "Headswim have harnessed a big, abrasive rock guitar sound and produced a debut of some promise".

Track listing

"Beneath a Black Moon" finishes at 3:36, and a hidden track begins at 11:05.

References

1994 albums
Headswim albums
Albums recorded at Rockfield Studios